"Promises" is a song by British EDM trio Nero that appears on their debut studio album, Welcome Reality (track No. 4) on 5 August 2011. The song debuted at number one on the UK Singles Chart, becoming the group's first chart-topping single. It sold 46,700 copies in its first week, the lowest first-week sales for a number one in 97 weeks. In 2013, the Skrillex and Nero remix of the song, won the Grammy Award for Best Remixed Recording, Non-Classical. "Promises" was nominated for an Ivor Novello Award in the category of Best Contemporary Song. The song was featured on a Hewlett-Packard TV commercial in the United Kingdom, France, United States and Latin America, giving it a broader audience and more recognition. It was also featured in trailers from the video game Sonic & All-Stars Racing Transformed. It also featured in the 2013 video game Saints Row IV.

Music video
A music video to accompany the release of "Promises", directed by Ben Newman, was uploaded to YouTube on 7 July 2011 at a total length of four minutes and sixteen seconds. It shows a woman in a dystopian regimented future society with mandatory drug consumption, similar in style to the film Equilibrium. By April 2022, it had surpassed 43 million YouTube views.

Critical reception
Robert Copsey of Digital Spy gave the song a positive review, stating:
"Promises, and they still feel oh so wasted on myself," she admits with her high-wired vocals over a thick, head-banging melody, fuzzy synths and pulsating basslines wobblier than our man's dodgy left knee. The result is the sharpest, most head-spinning of their releases to date – and given that we're in the year of dubstep-goes-pop, should leave fans fully equipped to handle the g-force levels of their first long player.

Impact and legacy
In 2022, American magazine Rolling Stone ranked "Promises" number 42 in their list of 200 Greatest Dance Songs of All Time.

Track listing

Charts

Weekly charts

Year-end charts

Certifications

Release history

References

External links
 Official Vevo music video
 Official Skrillex remix

2011 singles
Nero (band) songs
MTA Records singles
Number-one singles in Scotland
UK Singles Chart number-one singles
Grammy Award for Best Remixed Recording, Non-Classical